Henry Hubbard Kendall (March 4, 1855 – February 28, 1943) was an American architect from  Boston, Massachusetts.  He wrote a letter to the U.S. Civil Service commission critiquing the low pay for government architects. Kendall was the senior partner in the firm Kendall, Taylor & Company. Several of his or the firm's works are listed on the U.S. National Register of Historic Places, for their architectural merit.

Kendall & Taylor was an architecture firm formed in 1908 by Henry H. Kendall and Bertrand E. Taylor. The firm did work in Durham, North Carolina.

Biography
Kendall was born March 4, 1855, in New Braintree, Massachusetts. He graduated with a degree in architecture from the Massachusetts Institute of Technology at the age of 20.

He was the senior partner at Kendall & Stevens in Boston with Edward F. Stevens (1890–95); and then Kendall, Taylor, and Stevens (1895–1909) with Stevens and Bertrand E. Taylor. He also formed Kendall, Stevens, and Lee (1909–12) (with Frederick Clare Lee).

He was a fellow of the American Institute of Architects (AIA) and served as the group's president from 1920 to 1922.

He died February 28, 1943, at his home in Newton Centre, Massachusetts.

Works
Works (with attribution) include:
Belchertown State School, 30 State St. Belchertown, MA (Kendall, Taylor & Co.), NRHP-listed 
Westborough State Hospital, along Lyman St. N of Chauncy Lake and jct. of South St. and MA 9 Westborough, MA (Kendall, Taylor & Stevens), NRHP-listed
White Memorial Building, 109 Main St. Houlton, ME (Kendall, Taylor & Stevens), NRHP-listed
Wrentham State School, Jct. of Emerald and North Sts. Wrentham, MA (Kendall & Taylor), NRHP-listed
Contributing property Beech Hill Summer Home District, Harrisville, NH (Kendall,Taylor & Stevens), NRHP-listed
John Sprunt Hill House, 900 S. Duke St. Durham, NC (Kendall & Taylor), NRHP-listed 
Watts Hospital, Broad St. and Club Blvd. Durham, NC (Kendall & Taylor), NRHP-listed 
A contributing property in the Watts-Hillandale Historic District, Durham, NC (Kendall and Taylor), NRHP-listed
One or more works in Beech Hill Summer Home District, Harrisville, NH (Kendall,Taylor & Stevens), NRHP-listed
Massachusetts Mental Health Center, 74 Fenwood Rd. Boston, MA (Kendall, Taylor & Co.), NRHP-listed
Watts Hospital, Broad St. and Club Blvd. Durham, NC (Kendall & Taylor), NRHP-listed
One or more works in Watts-Hillandale Historic District, Durham, NC (Kendall and Taylor), NRHP-listed

References

Further reading
Entry Biographical Dictionary of American Architects Los Angeles by Henry F. Withey and Elsie Rathburn Withey, New Age Publishing Company, 1956. Facsimile edition, Hennessey & Ingalls, Inc., 1970
Entry in FAIA, A Legacy of Leadership: Presidents of the AIA, 1857–2007 by R. Randall Vosbeck, Washington, DC: The American Institute of Architects, 2008

External links
Kendall Taylor & Company website

American architects
Fellows of the American Institute of Architects
Presidents of the American Institute of Architects
1855 births
1943 deaths
People from New Braintree, Massachusetts